Eulithidium rubrilineatum, common name the red line pheasant, is an extremely small species of sea snail with a calcareous opercula, a marine gastropod mollusk in the family Phasianellidae, the pheasant snails.

Description
This very small shell grows to a  height of 1.6 mm. The shell has a depressed turbinate shape. It contains 4-5 whorls. The umbilicus is only a small depression. The calcareous operculum has a white color. The shell shows about a dozen red, oblique spiral lines. The shoulders of the whorls are red with large white spots.

Distribution
This species occurs in the Pacific Ocean off California.

References

External links
 To Encyclopedia of Life
 To ITIS
 To World Register of Marine Species

Phasianellidae
Gastropods described in 1928